The Beal–Gaillard House is a historic house located at 111 Myrtlewood Lane in Mobile, Alabama. It is locally significant as an excellent example of a large country home constructed before the widespread use of highly sophisticated moldings and columnar orders.

Description and history 
It was built in 1836 in a Creole cottage style. It is located at the center of its original 5-acre plot, the northwest corner of which has been sold to a relative. The frame dwelling is raised on a high foundation wall made of about 32 courses of brick, and giving sufficient head room to be able to examine the beautifully mortised and pegged framing. It was placed on the National Register of Historic Places on October 18, 1984, as a part of the 19th Century Spring Hill Neighborhood Thematic Resource.

References

Houses completed in 1836
Houses on the National Register of Historic Places in Alabama
National Register of Historic Places in Mobile, Alabama
Houses in Mobile, Alabama
Creole cottage architecture in Alabama